Shane O'Donoghue may refer to:

 Shane O'Donoghue (field hockey) (born 1992), Irish field hockey player
 Shane O'Donoghue (journalist), Irish golf journalist